There are a large number of peaks named Black Butte in the United States, especially in the states of Arizona, California, Montana, and Nevada: